Dorota Malarczyk is a Polish numismatist and Islamicist, who is a curator of the Emeryk Hutten-Czapski Museum, which is the coin cabinet of the National Museum, Krakow. In 2020 the Royal Numismatic Society awarded her the Samir Shamma Prize for Islamic Numismatics. She was a member of the Organising Committee for the 16th International Numismatic Congress in Warsaw. Research projects have included: Umayyad coins from Marea, inscriptions from the Kom el-Dikka graveyard in Alexandria, gems engraved with Arabic inscriptions and silver currency in tenth-century Europe.

Selected publications 

 Wadyl, Sławomir, Kacper Martyka, and Dorota Malarczyk. "Early Abbasid dirhams from a newly discovered stronghold in Bornity near Pieniężno." Wiadomości Numizmatyczne (2018).
 Bogucki, Mateusz, et al. Frühmittelalterliche Münzfunde aus Polen: Inventar. Ermland und Masuren: Funde aus Polen 2011-2013: addenda et corrigenda. Institut für Archäologie und Ethnologie der Polnischen Akademie der Wissenschaften, 2016.
 Malarczyk, Dorota, and Roksana Wawrzczak. "Skarb z XI wieku z Grzymisławia, powiat człuchowski." Wiadomości Numizmatyczne (2016).
 Malarczyk, Dorota. "Orenice, gm. Piątek, pow. Łęczyca." Wiadomości Numizmatyczne 51.1 (2007): 183.
 Bogucki, Mateusz, Dorota Malarczyk, and Ewa Marczak. "The 10th century dirham hoard from the stronghold at Truszki Zalesie, Kolno poviat, Podlaskie Voivodeship." Wiadomości Numizmatyczne (2005).
 Bartczak, Andrzej, and Dorota Malarczyk. "Dirhams of some early medieval finds from the area of Great Poland." Wiadomości Numizmatyczne (2000).

References 

Year of birth missing (living people)
Living people
Polish women curators
Polish numismatists
Women numismatists
Islamic scholars
Women medievalists